The men's freestyle lightweight was a freestyle wrestling event held as part of the Wrestling at the 1924 Summer Olympics programme. It was the fourth appearance of the event. Lightweight was the third-lightest category, including wrestlers weighing from 61 to 66 kilograms.

Results
Source: Official results; Wudarski

Silver medal round

Bronze medal round

References

Wrestling at the 1924 Summer Olympics